The Concordia Stingers women's ice hockey program represents Concordia University in Montreal, Quebec in the sport of ice hockey in the RSEQ conference of U Sports. The Stingers have won three national championships, in 1998, 1999, and 2022, and 19 conference championships.

History
The Concordia Stingers women's ice hockey team earned varsity status in 1975, ensuring that they received financial support from the university.

After playing for the Providence Friars women's ice hockey program and without any NCAA eligibility remaining, Cammi Granato moved to Montreal to earn her master's degree in sports administration at Concordia University. In 123 games, Granato scored 178 goals and 148 assists for 326 points, and was instrumental in Concordia capturing three consecutive provincial championships.

In 1997-98, the CIAU recognized women's hockey. The Stingers won their first National Championship that year, which was held at Concordia. In the 2000 semi-finals, the Stingers were bested by the Alberta Pandas by a 4-3 tally. That year, the Stingers took third place. In the 2000-01 season, Stingers player Lisa-Marie Breton led the Quebec Student Sports Federation with eight goals and six assists in just six games.

The team is coached by four-time Olympic medallist Julie Chu, after former coach Les Lawton accumulated more than 500 victories as Stingers head coach before stepping down due to health issues.

Erica Porter, who played five years with the Stingers (2011–16), earning academic all-Canadian honors in each year, was among 18 former student-athletes selected for the 2021 U SPORTS Female Apprentice Coach Program. In celebration of International Women's Day, involving apprentice coaches (former student-athletes) with a mentor head coach, the purpose of the program is geared towards increasing the number of women in coaching positions across Canadian universities. Having Porter was also athletics valedictorian at the Concordia awards banquet in 2016. Of note, she shall be mentored by Concordia coaches Caroline Ouellette and Julie Chu.

Exhibition

National championships

U Sports Tournament results

International

Olympics
The following Stingers alumni have participated in ice hockey at the Winter Olympic games.

Awards and honours
Karen Kendall, 1998 TSN Award
Lisa-Marie Breton, 1999 Concordia University Fittest Female Athlete
Lisa-Marie Breton, 2000 QSSF all-star, Second Team
Lisa-Marie Breton, 2000 Concordia University Fittest Female Athlete
Lisa-Marie Breton, 2001 Concordia University Fittest Female Athlete
Lisa-Marie Breton, 2001 Concordia University Female Athlete of the Year
Lisa-Marie Breton, 2001 QSSF all-star, First Team
Lisa-Marie Breton, 2001 CIAU All-Canadian
Lisa-Marie Breton, 2002 Concordia University Fittest Female Athlete 
Lisa-Marie Breton, 2002 QSSF all-star, Second Team
Cecilia Anderson, 2004 QSSF Female Rockie of the year
Cecilia Anderson, 2004 QSSF all-star, First Team
Cecilia Anderson, 2005 Concordia Female Athlete of the year
Cecilia Anderson, 2005 Conference MVP
Cecilia Anderson, 2005 QSSF all-star, First Team
Cecilia Anderson, 2006 Concordia Director Shield
Erin Lally, 2011 QSSF Second Team All-Star
Audrey Doyon-Lessard, 2011 RSEQ Most Outstanding Player, Quebec university women's hockey league 
Audrey Doyon-Lessard, 2011 RSEQ First Team All-Star
Alyssa Sherrard, 2011 RSEQ All-Rookie Team
Alexandra Nikolidakis, 2017 USports All-Rookie Team
Marie Joelle Allard, 2018 U SPORTS Women's Hockey Championship Tournament All-Star Team

RSEQ Awards
2019-20 RSEQ PLAYER OF THE YEAR: Rosalie Bégin-Cyr

Rookie of the Year
2014-15 RSEQ ROOKIE OF THE YEAR: Katherine Purchase
2019-20 RSEQ ROOKIE OF THE YEAR: Emmy Fecteau, Concordia

RSEQ All-Stars
First Team
2019-20 RSEQ First Team All-Star: Audrey Belzile, Concordia
2016-17 RSEQ First Team All-Stars: Caroll-Ann Gagné
2019-20 RSEQ FIRST TEAM ALL-STAR: Brigitte Laganiere
2019-20 RSEQ FIRST TEAM ALL-STAR: Rosalie Bégin-Cyr

Second Team
2019-20 RSEQ SECOND TEAM ALL-STAR: Alexandra Nikolikdakis 
2019-20 RSEQ SECOND TEAM ALL-STAR: Claudia Dubois 
2016-17 RSEQ Second Team All-Stars: Marie-Joëlle Allard
2016-17 RSEQ Second Team All-Stars: Claudia Dubois

All-Rookie Team
2019-20 RSEQ ALL-ROOKIE TEAM: Emmy Fecteau 
2016-17 RSEQ All-Rookie Team: Audrey Belzile, Concordia
2016-17 RSEQ All-Rookie Team: Alexandra Nikolidakis 
2016-17 RSEQ All-Rookie Team: Brigitte Laganière

Coach of the Year
2016-17 RSEQ COACH OF THE YEAR: Julie Chu
Les Lawton, 2000 CIS Coach of the Year

U Sports Awards

All-Canadians
2003-04 Dominique Rancour
2002-03 Suzanne Kaye
2002-03 Marie Claude Allard
2001-'02 Marie Claude Allard
2001-02 Suzanne Kaye
2000-01 Lisa-Marie Breton
1999-2000 Corinne Swirsky
1998-99 Corinne Swirsky
1998-99 Geneviève Fagnan
1997-98 Corinne Swirsky
1997-98 Anne Rodrigue
1997-98 Delaney Collins

First Team
2019-20 Rosalie Bégin-Cyr, 1st Team
2004-05 Roxanne Dupuis, 1st Team
2003-04 Cecilia Anderson, 1st Team

Second Team
2019-20: Brigitte Laganière, 2nd Team
2004-05 Dominique Rancour, 2nd Team
2004-05 Cecilia Anderson, 2nd Team

All-Rookies
2019-20: Emmy Fecteau

Brodrick Trophy
The Brodrick Trophy is awarded to the CIS Player of the Year.
Corinne Swirsky, 1998, 1999, 2000

Marion Hilliard Award
Janna Gillis, 2004 Marion Hilliard Award
Lauren Houghton, 2002 Marion Hilliard Award

Most Valuable Player CIS playoffs
Corinne Swirsky, 1998

Tissot Rookie of the Year
Cecilia Anderson, 2004

University Awards
2019-20 Laurie Brodrick Award (Concordia's Female Rookie of the Year): Emmy Fecteau
2019-20 President’s Academic Award (presented to the top female student-athlete): Alexandra Nikolidakis
2019-20 Michael Di Grappa Award of Distinction (for career contribution to the Stingers): Claudia Dubois

Sally Kemp Award
2019-20 Sally Kemp Award (presented to the Stingers Female Athlete of the Year): Rosalie Bégin-Cyr
2004-05 Sally Kemp Award: Cecilia Anderson
2002-03 Sally Kemp Award: Marie-Claude Allard
2000-01 Sally Kemp Award: Lisa-Marie Breton
1998-99 Sally Kemp Award: Corinne Swirsky
1997-98 Sally Kemp Award: Corinne Swirsky
1996-97 Sally Kemp Award: Corinne Swirsky
1994-95 Sally Kemp Award: Cammi Granato
1991-92 Sally Kemp Award: Marie-Claude Roy
1990-91 Sally Kemp Award: Laura Leslie
1989-90 Sally Kemp Award: Annie Caron
1988-89 Sally Kemp Award: Therese Brisson
1987-88 Sally Kemp Award: Therese Brisson
1983-84 Sally Kemp Award: Maureen Maloney
1981-82 Sally Kemp Award: Corinne Corcoran
1979-80 Sally Kemp Award: Denise Bienvenu
1975-76 Sally Kemp Award: Marjorie Ross

Hockey Hall of Fame

Stingers in pro hockey

References

Women's ice hockey
U Sports women's ice hockey teams
Women's ice hockey teams in Canada
Ice hockey teams in Montreal
Women in Quebec